Switzerland's Marc Rosset defeated Spain's Jordi Arrese in the final, 7–6(7–2), 6–4, 3–6, 4–6, 8–6 to win the gold medal in Men's Singles tennis at the 1992 Summer Olympics. Croatia's Goran Ivanišević and the Unified Team's Andrei Cherkasov won the bronze medals. All four nations won medals in men's singles for the first time.

The tournament was held at the Tennis de la Vall d'Hebron in Barcelona, Spain. There were 64 players from 35 nations. Nations had been limited to three players each since tennis returned to the Olympic program in 1988.

Miloslav Mečíř of Czechoslovakia was the reigning gold medalist from 1988, but he retired from the sport in 1990.

Background

This was the ninth (medal) appearance of the men's singles tennis event. The event has been held at every Summer Olympics where tennis has been on the program: from 1896 to 1924 and then from 1988 to the current program. Demonstration events were held in 1968 and 1984.

The number one seed was Jim Courier of the United States. Stefan Edberg of Sweden was the number two seed, while American Pete Sampras was third. Stefan Edberg and Carl-Uwe Steeb of Germany were the only two quarterfinalists from 1988 that returned.

The Bahamas, Croatia, Indonesia, Morocco, Peru, and Puerto Rico each made their debut in the event. Some former Soviet republics competed as the Unified Team. One Yugoslav player competed as an Independent Olympic Participant. France made its eighth appearance, most among all nations, having missed only the 1904 event.

Competition format

The competition was a single-elimination tournament. No bronze medal match was held. All matches were best-of-five sets. The 12-point tie-breaker was used in any set, except the fifth, that reached 6–6.

Schedule

All times are Central European Summer Time (UTC+2)

Seeds

Draw

Finals

Top half

Section 1

Section 2

Bottom half

Section 3

Section 4

References

ITF Olympic site

Men's singles
Men's events at the 1992 Summer Olympics